Jozef Kovalík was the defending champion but chose not to defend his title.

Tallon Griekspoor won the title after defeating Andrea Pellegrino 6–3, 6–2 in the final.

Seeds

Draw

Finals

Top half

Bottom half

References

External links
Main draw
Qualifying draw

Tennis Napoli Cup - 1
2021 Singles